Tangarona is a genus of wrinkled bark beetles in the family Carabidae. Tangarona pensa, found in New Zealand, is the only species of this genus.

Tangarona pensa measure  in length.

References

Rhysodinae
Monotypic beetle genera
Endemic fauna of New Zealand
Endemic insects of New Zealand